Great White Whale is the debut album by the Canadian rock band, Secret and Whisper. The album was in the works for about a year and was released on February 12, 2008. A music video was shot in Pittsburgh for the album's first single, "XOXOXO." The album reached number 17 on iTunes's top 100 albums in its first week on sale.

Track listing

Furney said the band might put both of the Japanese bonus tracks on iTunes if they receive enough public demand.

Credits
Produced by: Travis Saunders, Danny McBride, Secret & Whisper
Mixed by: Jeff Schneweis at Old Sailor Studios
Mastered by: Troy Glessner at Spectre South
A&R: Jimmy Ryan
Management: Mark Lafay at Middle Coast Management
Legal: Shawna Hilleary at The Artist Law Group

All songs written and performed by Secret & Whisper
All lyrics by Charles David Furney
Seesaw Music Playground (SOCAN/ASCAP)

Art Direction by: Invisible Creature, Inc.
Illustration & Design by: Ryan Clark for Invisible Creature, Inc.
Band photograph by: Christina Tomaras

References

2008 debut albums
Secret and Whisper albums
Tooth & Nail Records albums